Botswana Center for Public Integrity (BCPI) is a Botswana  non-governmental organization that works to increase transparency (social), integrity and accountability in Botswana through the provision of policy-oriented research, monitoring, capacity building and advocacy on political corruption and aid effectiveness.

Organizational values 
BCPI's values are as follows;

 Accountability and Responsibility
 Cooperation and Partnership
 Integrity and Honesty 
 Impartiality and Non-Partisan
 Transparency and Openness

See also 

 Corruption Watch (South Africa)
 ACCU Uganda
 International Anti-Corruption Conference

References

External links 

 Official website

Anti-corruption non-governmental organizations
Organisations based in Gaborone